Metacyclops is a genus of copepod crustaceans in the family Cyclopidae, containing 61 species, of which three are listed on the IUCN Red List – M. campestris from Brazil (conservation dependent), M. gasparoi from Italy (vulnerable) and M. postojnae from Slovenia (vulnerable).

Metacyclops aequatorialis Dussart, 1978
Metacyclops agnitus Herbst, 1988
Metacyclops amicitiae Kolaczynski, 2015
Metacyclops amoenus (Mann, 1940)
Metacyclops botosaneanui Pesce, 1985
Metacyclops brauni Herbst, 1962
Metacyclops campestris Reid, 1987
Metacyclops chelazzii Dumont, 1981
Metacyclops communis Lindberg, 1938
Metacyclops concavus Kiefer, 1937
Metacyclops curtispinosus Dussart, 1984
Metacyclops cushae Reid, 1991
Metacyclops dengizicus (Lepeshkin, 1900)
Metacyclops dentatus Plesa, 1981
Metacyclops denticulatus Dussart & Frutos, 1986
Metacyclops deserticus Mercado-Salas & Suárez-Morales, 2013
Metacyclops dianae Pesce, 1985
Metacyclops exsulis (Gauthier, 1951)
Metacyclops gasparoi Stoch, 1987
Metacyclops geltrudeae Galassi & Pesce, 1994
Metacyclops gracilis (Lilljeborg, 1853)
Metacyclops grandis (Kiefer, 1935)
Metacyclops grandispinifer (Lindberg, 1940)
Metacyclops hannensis Defaye, 1993
Metacyclops hartmanni Herbst, 1960
Metacyclops hirsutus C. E. F. Rocha, 1994
Metacyclops janstocki Herbst, 1990
Metacyclops laticornis (Lowndes, 1934)
Metacyclops leptopus (Kiefer, 1927)
Metacyclops longimaxillis Defaye & Por, 2010
Metacyclops lusitanus Lindberg, 1961
Metacyclops malayicus Kiefer, 1930
Metacyclops margaretae Lindberg, 1938
Metacyclops mendocinus (Wierzejski, 1892)
Metacyclops micropus Kiefer, 1932
Metacyclops minutus (Claus, 1863)
Metacyclops mortoni Pesce, De Laurentiis & Humphreys, 1996
Metacyclops mutatus Herbst, 1988
Metacyclops necessarius (Kiefer, 1926)
Metacyclops oraemaris C. E. F. Rocha, 1994
Metacyclops paludicola (Herbst, 1959)
Metacyclops pectiniatus Shen & Tai, 1964
Metacyclops planus (Gurney, 1909)
Metacyclops postojnae Brancelj, 1987
Metacyclops problematicus Dumont, 1973
Metacyclops prolatus Kiefer, 1935
Metacyclops pseudoanceps (Green, 1962)
Metacyclops rudis Plesa, 1981
Metacyclops ryukyuensis Ishida, 1995
Metacyclops somalicus Dumont, 1981
Metacyclops stammeri Kiefer, 1938
Metacyclops subaequalis Dussart, 1984
Metacyclops subdolus Kiefer, 1938
Metacyclops superincidentis Karanovic, 2004
Metacyclops thailandicus Boonyanusith, Sanoamuang & Brancelj, 2018
Metacyclops tredecimus (Lowndes, 1934)
Metacyclops trisetosus Herbst, 1957
Metacyclops trispinosus Dumont, 1981
Metacyclops tropicus (Kiefer, 1932)
Metacyclops unacanthus Lindberg, 1936
Metacyclops woni Lee & Chang, 2015

Metacyclops arenicolus Fryer, 1956 → Allocyclops arenicolus (Fryer, 1956)
Metacyclops arnaudi (Sars G.O., 1908) → Pescecyclops arnaudi (Sars G.O., 1908)
Metacyclops dimorphus (Kiefer, 1934) → Apocyclops dimorphus (Kiefer, 1934)
Metacyclops distans Kiefer, 1956 → Apocyclops distans (Kiefer, 1956)
Metacyclops fiersi De Laurentiis, Pesce & Humphreys, 2001 → Fierscyclops fiersi (De Laurentiis, Pesce & Humphreys, 2001)
Metacyclops kimberleyi Karanovic, 2004 → Pescecyclops kimberleyi (Karanovic, 2004)
Metacyclops laurentiisae Karanovic, 2004 → Pescecyclops laurentiisae (Karanovic, 2004)
Metacyclops monacanthus (Kiefer, 1928) → Pescecyclops monacanthus (Kiefer, 1928)
Metacyclops panamensis (Marsh, 1913) → Apocyclops panamensis (Marsh, 1913)
Metacyclops pilanus Karanovic, 2004 → Pescecyclops pilanus (Karanovic, 2004)
Metacyclops pilbaricus Karanovic, 2004 → Pescecyclops pilbaricus (Karanovic, 2004)
Metacyclops procerus (Herbst, 1955) → Apocyclops procerus (Herbst, 1955)
Metacyclops royi Lindberg, 1940 → Apocyclops royi (Lindberg, 1940)
Metacyclops spartinus (Ruber, 1966) → Apocyclops spartinus (Ruber, 1968)
Metacyclops stocki Pesce, 1985 → Hesperocyclops stocki (Pesce, 1985)
Metacyclops viduus (Kiefer, 1933) → Apocyclops viduus (Kiefer, 1933)

References

Cyclopidae
Cyclopoida genera
Taxonomy articles created by Polbot